Park Seung-rin (born 23 August 1953) is a South Korean sports shooter. He competed in the men's 50 metre free pistol event at the 1984 Summer Olympics.

References

1953 births
Living people
South Korean male sport shooters
Olympic shooters of South Korea
Shooters at the 1984 Summer Olympics
Place of birth missing (living people)
Shooters at the 1982 Asian Games
Asian Games competitors for South Korea